Hawksworth is a surname. Notable people with the surname include:

Blake Hawksworth (born 1983), major league pitcher for the St. Louis Cardinals
David Leslie Hawksworth (born 1946), British mycologist and lichenologist
Derek Hawksworth (1927–2021), footballer, who played for Sheffield United F.C.
Ernest Hawksworth (1894–1961), English footballer
Erin Hawksworth, Canadian reporter in Boston, Massachusetts
Frederick Hawksworth (1884–1976), Chief Mechanical Engineer, Great Western Railway
Jack Hawksworth (born 1991), English racing driver
John Hawksworth (born 1961), English golfer
Johnny Hawksworth (1924–2009), British musician and composer
Phil Hawksworth (1913–2003), New Zealand badminton player
Tony Hawksworth (born 1938), English footballer
William Hawksworth (1911–1966), New Zealand cricketer

English-language surnames
English toponymic surnames